Aglaogonia is a genus of moths of the family Tortricidae.

Species
Aglaogonia eupena (Turner, 1946)
Aglaogonia historica (Meyrick, 1920)

See also
List of Tortricidae genera

References

External links
tortricidae.com

Tortricidae genera
Taxa named by Marianne Horak
Olethreutinae